27th Army may refer to:

Twenty-Seventh Army (Japan)
27th Army (People's Republic of China)
27th Army (Soviet Union)

See also
 27th Battalion (disambiguation)
 27th Brigade (disambiguation)
 XXVII Corps (disambiguation)
 27th Division (disambiguation)
 27th Regiment (disambiguation)
 27 Squadron (disambiguation)